WTJP-TV, virtual channel 60 (UHF digital channel 26), is a television station licensed to Gadsden, Alabama, United States, serving the Birmingham area as an owned-and-operated station of the Trinity Broadcasting Network (TBN). The station's studios are located on Rosedale Avenue in Gadsden, and its transmitter is located on Blount Mountain near Springville, Alabama.

WTJP-TV's signal was formerly relayed on low-power translator stations W51BY (channel 51) in Jasper and W46BU (channel 46) in Tuscaloosa; the latter station went silent on April 13, 2010 due to declining support, which was attributed to the digital transition.

History

The station first signed on the air on July 22, 1986, and was built and signed on by the Trinity Broadcasting Network.

Technical information

Subchannels

Analog-to-digital conversion
WTJP-TV shut down its analog signal, over UHF channel 60, on April 16, 2009, ahead of the official June 12 date in which full-power television stations in the United States transitioned from analog to digital broadcasts under federal mandate. The station's digital signal remained on its pre-transition UHF channel 26. Through the use of PSIP, digital television receivers display the station's virtual channel as its former UHF analog channel 60, which was among the high band UHF channels (52-69) that were removed from broadcasting use as a result of the transition.

References

External links

Television channels and stations established in 1986
1986 establishments in Alabama
Trinity Broadcasting Network affiliates
TJP-TV